The ARIA Music Award for Breakthrough Artist – Single was an award presented at the annual ARIA Music Awards. It was presented from 1989 through to 2009 and 2011.

This, and the ARIA Award for Breakthrough Artist – Album was merged in 2012 to form a single award for ARIA Award for Breakthrough Artist - Release.

Winners and nominees

References

External links
The ARIA Awards Official website

B
Music awards for breakthrough artist